Yenidam can refer to:

 Yenidam, Kovancılar
 Yenidam, Seyhan